The National Defense College of the United Arab Emirates, or NDC, is an education organization in Abu Dhabi, United Arab Emirates, that provides advanced training for both senior military officers and civilians.  It was officially opened in December 2013 by Sheikh Mohammed bin Zayed Al Nahyan, Crown Prince of Abu Dhabi and Deputy Supreme Commander of the UAE Armed Forces. Its first Dean was John R. Ballard, a former US Marine. Its current Dean is Thomas Drohan. Among its faculty is Joel Hayward, a "noted scholar of war and strategy", whom the daily newspaper Al Kaleej calls "a world authority on international conflict and strategy".

References

Educational institutions established in 2013
Military schools
Peace and conflict studies
Staff colleges
Military education and training in the United Arab Emirates
2013 establishments in the United Arab Emirates